Luke Henman (born April 29, 2000) is a Canadian professional ice hockey centre playing for Coachella Valley Firebirds in the American Hockey League (AHL) while under contract to the Seattle Kraken of the National Hockey League (NHL).

Playing career
Henman was drafted to play junior ice hockey by the Cape Breton Screaming Eagles of the QMJHL in 2016 but was traded to the Blainville-Boisbriand Armada before playing for the Eagles after choosing not to report to camp. He was later drafted by the Carolina Hurricanes of the NHL in the fourth round of the 2018 NHL Entry Draft but did not sign. 

On May 12, 2021, Henman agreed to a three-year, entry-level contract with the Seattle Kraken, becoming the first player in Kraken history to sign with the franchise. Henman was later cut from the Kraken's camp roster to be assigned to Seattle's 2021 AHL affiliate, the Charlotte Checkers.

Career statistics

References

External links

2000 births
Living people
Allen Americans players
Blainville-Boisbriand Armada players
Carolina Hurricanes draft picks
Charlotte Checkers (2010–) players
Coachella Valley Firebirds players
Ice hockey people from Nova Scotia
Sportspeople from Dartmouth, Nova Scotia